The Guys from Baku is a KVN team from Baku, Azerbaijan that was active during the late 1980s and the early 1990s. They were Major League Champions in 1992, Finalists in 1993, and Champions of the "Tournament of Ten" in 2000. They also won the Summer Cup in 1995 that was played in their home city.

See also
Anar Mammadkhanov
Bahram Bagirzade
Elchin Azizov

References 

KVN
Sport in Azerbaijan